Confessions of a Foyer Girl is a 1978 short film created by Aardman Animations. It is part of the Animated Conversations series. In this short, creators David Sproxton and Peter Lord "applied the groundbreaking technique of using recorded conversations of real people as the basis for the script".

Production
According to Aardman Animation:

References

1978 films
British short films
1970s animated short films
1970s English-language films